Maggie is an unincorporated community in Mason County, in the U.S. state of West Virginia.

History
A post office called Maggie was established in 1887, and remained in operation until 1935. The community was named after a woman named Maggie, who was instrumental in establishing a post office for the town.

References

Unincorporated communities in Mason County, West Virginia
Unincorporated communities in West Virginia